The Roman Catholic Metropolitan Archdiocese of Caracas is the Latin an ecclesiastical territory of the Roman Catholic Church in part of Venezuela. It was founded as the Diocese of Caracas on June 20, 1637, and was later elevated to the rank of a Metropolitan see on November 27, 1803.
 
This episcopal see occupies a territory of about 790 square kilometers and is not unlikely to be given several auxiliary bishops. The most recent Metropolitan Archbishop had been  Jorge Urosa, appointed by Pope Benedict XVI on September 19, 2005 (and elevated to Cardinal in 2006); retirement accepted July 9, 2018 by Pope Francis. Baltazar Enrique Porras Cardozo was also appointed as Apostolic Administrator at the same day.

Its cathedral episcopal see is the Catedral Metropolitana de Santa Ana, in national capital Caracas, Distrito Federal, which also has three Minor Basilicas: Basílica de Santa Teresa,  Basílica San Pedro Apóstol and Basílica Santuario de Santa Capilla (also a National Shrine).

History 
 Established on 20 June 1637 as Diocese of Caracas alias Santiago de Venezuela, on vast territory split off from the suppressed Diocese of Coro, which had itself been established in 1531, by the Papal Bull Pro Excellentia praeeminentia issued by Pope Clement VII in St. Peter's in Rome on 21 June of that year and was based in Coro, Falcón State, then the capital of Venezuela, but vacant since 1721 to 1727.
 It lost territories in 1715 to establish the Apostolic Prefecture of Curaçao and on 16 February 1778 to establish the Diocese of Mérida (Venezuela).
 The Diocese was elevated to Metropolitan Archdiocese of Caracas by the papal bull In universalis ecclesiae regimine issued by Pope Pius VII on November 24, 1803. Until then it was a suffragan in the Ecclesiastical Province of the Archdiocese of Santo Domingo on Hispaniola, now in the Dominican Republic.
 It lost more territories repeatedly to establish Dioceses : on 1863.03.07 to establish the Calabozo, on 1922.10.12 Valencia (Venezuela), on 1958.06.21 Maracay, on 1965.07.23 Los Teques (its suffragan) and on 1970.04.15 La Guaira (also its suffragan).
 It enjoyed papal visits by Pope John Paul II in January 1985 and February 1996.

Province 
Its ecclesiastical province in Venezuela comprises the metropolitan's own archdiocese and the following suffragan sees: 
 Roman Catholic Diocese of Guarenas
 Roman Catholic Diocese of La Guaira
 Roman Catholic Diocese of Los Teques

Bishops

Ordinaries
Bishops of Caracas
 Juan López de Agurto de la Mata (1637)
 Mauro Diego de Tovar y Valle Maldonado, O.S.B. (1639-1652), appointed Bishop of Chiapas
 Alonso de Briceño, O.F.M. (1653–1668)
 Antonio González de Acuña (1670–1682)
 Diego de Baños y Sotomayor (1683–1706)
 Francisco del Rincón, O.M. (1714–1716), Archbishop (personal title); appointed Archbishop of  Santafé en Nueva Granada
 Juan José de Escalona y Calatayud (1717–1728), appointed Bishop of Michoacán
 José Félix Valverde (1728–1738), appointed Bishop of Michoacán
 Juan García Abadiano (1738–1747)
 Manuel Machado y Luna (1749–1752)
 Francisco de Antolino (1752–1755)
 Diego Díez Madroñero (1756–1769)
 Mariano Martí (1770–1792)
 Juan de la Virgen María y Viana (1792–1798)
 Francisco de Ibarra (1798–1803)

Archbishops of Caracas
 Francisco de Ibarra (1803–1806)
 Narciso Coll y Prat (1808–1822), appointed Bishop of Palencia
 Ramón Méndez (1827–1839)
 Ignacio Fernández Peña (1841–1849)
 Silvestre Guevara y Lira (1852–1876)
 José Antonio Ponte (1876–1883)
 Críspulo Uzcátegui (1884–1904)
 Juan Bautista-Castro (1904–1915)
 Felipe Rincón González (1916–1946)
 Lucas Guillermo Castillo Hernández (1946–1955)
 Rafael Arias Blanco (1955–1959)
 Cardinal José Humberto Quintero Parra (1960–1980)
 Cardinal José Lebrún Moratinos (1980–1995)
 Cardinal Ignacio Velasco, S.D.B. (1995–2003)
 Cardinal Jorge Urosa (2005–2018)
 Cardinal Baltazar Enrique Porras Cardozo (2023–present)

Coadjutor bishops
 Juan Bautista-Castro (1903–1904)
 Lucas Guillermo Castillo Hernández (1939–1946)
 Rafael Arias Blanco (1952–1955)
 José Lebrún Moratinos (1972–1980); future Cardinal

Auxiliary bishops
Nicolás Eugenio Navarro (1943–1960)
Ramón J. Lizardi (1956–1972)
José Rincón Bonilla (1961–1984)
Luis Eduardo Henríquez Jiménez (1962–1972), appointed Bishop of Valencia en Venezuela
Jesús Maria Pellin (1965–1969)
Ramón Ovidio Pérez Morales (1970–1980), appointed Bishop of Coro
Marcial Augusto Ramírez Ponce (1972–1996), appointed Bishop of Venezuela, Military
Ramón Hernández Peña (1974–1976), appointed Coadjutor Bishop of Trujillo
Alfredo José Rodríguez Figueroa (1974–1987), appointed Bishop of Cumaná
Miguel Delgado Avila, S.D.B. (1979–1991), appointed Bishop of Barcelona
Jorge Liberato Urosa Savino (1982–1990), appointed Archbishop of Valencia en Venezuela (later returned here as Archbishop); future Cardinal
José Vicente Henriquez Andueza, S.D.B. (1985–1987), appointed Bishop of Maracay 
Ubaldo Ramón Santana Sequera, F.M.I. (1990–1991), appointed Bishop of Ciudad Guayana
Diego Rafael Padrón Sánchez (1990–1994), appointed Bishop of Maturín
Mario del Valle Moronta Rodríguez (1990–1995), appointed Bishop of Los Teques
Roberto Antonio Dávila Uzcátegui (1992–2005)
Rafael Ramón Conde Alfonzo (1995–1997), appointed Coadjutor Bishop of La Guaira
José de la Trinidad Valera Angulo (1997–2001), appointed Bishop of La Guaira
Pedro Nicolás Bermúdez Villamizar, C.I.M. (1997–2009)
Saúl Figueroa Albornoz (1997–2011), appointed Bishop of Puerto Cabello
Luis Armando Tineo Rivera (2007–2013), appointed Bishop of Carora
Jesús González de Zárate Salas (2007–2018), appointed Archbishop of Cumaná
Fernando José Castro Aguayo (2009–2015), appointed Bishop of Margarita
Tulio Luis Ramírez Padilla (2012–2020), appointed Bishop of Guarenas
José Trinidad Fernández Angulo (2014–2021), appointed Bishop of Trujillo
Enrique José Parravano Marino, S.D.B. (2016–2019), appointed Bishop of Maracay 
Ricardo Aldo Barreto Cairo (2019–)
 Carlos Márquez Delima (2021-)
Lisandro Alirio Rivas Durán (2021-)

Other priests of this diocese who became bishops
José Manuel Arroyo y Niño, appointed Bishop of Guayana in 1856
Román Lovera, appointed Bishop of Mérida in 1880
Manuel Arteaga y Betancourt, appointed Archbishop of San Cristobal de la Habana, Cuba in 1941 (Cardinal in 1946)

See also 
 Roman Catholicism in Venezuela

References

Sources and external links
 Official website
 GCatholic.org, with incumbent biography links
 Catholic-Hierarchy 
 Catholic Encyclopedia

Caracas
1637 establishments in the Spanish Empire
Religious organizations established in the 1630s
Roman Catholic dioceses in Venezuela
Roman Catholic Ecclesiastical Province of Caracas, Santiago de Venezuela
Roman Catholic dioceses and prelatures established in the 17th century